Juliaca District is one of four districts of the province San Román in Peru. Its seat is Juliaca.

See also 
 Intikancha

References